Singapore Bible College (SBC) is an evangelical Bible college in Singapore. SBC has over 500 students, representing 25 countries. The current principal is Rev. Dr. Clement Chia.

History
Singapore Bible College was established in 1952. It was founded by "pastors and leaders from Anglican, Baptist, Methodist, Presbyterian and independent churches, with the support of the Chinese Church Union, Christian Nationals Evangelism Commission (CNEC) and the Overseas Missionary Fellowship (OMF)." According to former principal Albert Ting, it was founded "to uphold the authority of God's Word at the time when the Scriptures were under severe attack from the liberals of that era." Ting asserts that SBC is a "living testimony to the effectiveness and authority of God's Word as we expound a Bible-based theological education."

SBC consists of four schools: two Schools of Theology in English and Chinese language respectively; a School of Church Music and a School of Counselling. The college has a vocal group, the Singapore Bible College Chorale.

SBC is committed to being "Christ-centred," "Bible-based," "Church-oriented," "Missions-directed," and "Context-relevant".

Accreditation
Singapore Bible College is accredited by the Asia Theological Association to offer the following degrees:

Chinese 
 Master of Divinity
 Master of Arts
 Graduate Diploma in Christian Studies
 Diploma in Christian Studies
 Diploma in Holistic Growth: Marketplace, Family and Lifelong Planning

English
Master of Divinity
Master of Arts in Biblical Studies
Master of Arts in Intercultural Studies
Graduate Diploma in Intercultural Studies
Graduate Diploma in Christian Studies
Mdiv/MA Preparatory Year

Advanced Studies
Master of Theology (bilingual)
Doctor of Ministry

Counselling
Master of Arts in Counseliing (also accredited by Singapore Association for Counselling)
Graduate Diploma in Counselling

References

External links
 

Educational institutions established in 1952
Seminaries and theological colleges in Singapore
Evangelical seminaries and theological colleges
1952 establishments in Malaya